Rinat Flurovich Vasikov (born 13 September 1971) is a former Russian professional footballer.

Club career
He made his professional debut in the Russian Third League in 1995 for FC Gornyak-Vanadiy Kachkanar. He played 3 games in the UEFA Intertoto Cup 1996 for FC Uralmash Yekaterinburg.

References

1971 births
Living people
People from Bashkortostan
Russian footballers
Association football midfielders
FC Ural Yekaterinburg players
FC Amkar Perm players
FC KAMAZ Naberezhnye Chelny players
Russian Premier League players
FC Uralets Nizhny Tagil players
Sportspeople from Bashkortostan